Chataz (also Romanized as Chetez; also known as Chhātaz) is a village in Ijrud-e Bala Rural District, in the Central District of Ijrud County, Zanjan Province, Iran. At the 2006 census, its population was 741, in 167 families.

References 

Populated places in Ijrud County